While rugby league has been played in the United States since 1954, with Australia and New Zealand playing games there on their return from the Rugby League World Cup in France, serious attempts to start the sport in the United States began only in the late 1970s. The establishment of a national team and a domestic competition in the late 20th century has seen more recent progress.

The United States national rugby league team has participated in international competition since 1987. In 1998, the country's first domestic competition, the American National Rugby League (AMNRL), was launched as a semi-professional league, predominantly based in the Northeastern and Mid-Atlantic states, and affiliated to the Rugby League International Federation, the sport's world governing body. In 2011, a new domestic competition, the USA Rugby League, began.

History
Games related to rugby football were played in the United States in the early 19th century. During this time the sports had no fixed rules, and were particularly popular in universities and college preparatory schools in the Northeastern United States. The sport of American football evolved from these intercollegiate games.

Meanwhile, in Huddersfield, England a schism developed in rugby football between those who favored strict amateurism and those who felt that players should be compensated for time taken off work to play rugby. Many Northern English industrial towns tended to be poorer, the working class players often working in industries that had long hours of manual labour for which they would not get paid for time off. Amateur status for players in these towns was therefore not just financially difficult, but also physically demanding due to the nature of their work. In 1895 this resulted in the formation of a break-away professional sport, rugby league, the rules of the two codes of rugby (union and league) would themselves diverge. The bulk of the clubs conforming to the new sport consisted of Northern English towns. Whilst the new form of rugby was taken to countries such as France and Australia, American rugby continued to be played solely under rugby union rules. The sport was eclipsed by American football and was confined to California by the time of the 1920 Olympics.

In 1939, the Californian Rugby Football Union wrote to the governing body of rugby league, the Rugby Football League, to tell them they wanted to switch from rugby union and affiliate to the RFL. In June 1939, the RFL made plans to send a delegation out to California but were unable to do so due to the outbreak of World War II.

1950s: American All-Stars
One of the earliest attempts to introduce rugby league to the United States was in 1953, when Mike Dimitro, a wrestling promoter and former UCLA football all star and NFL Rams player (1947 draft), was asked to organize a tour of Australasia by an American rugby league side. The team was given a huge schedule that included 26 matches against Australian and New Zealand sides. None of the 22 American players had ever played rugby league prior to the tour, and they presented themselves in American football-like attire early on in the tournament. The side won only six games as well as drawing two.

Their second match of the tour, against a Sydney side, drew a crowd of 65,453 to the Sydney Cricket Ground. After a consistent lack of competition, crowds were good but never reached the same heights. In turn the tour did not in turn bring any benefits to American rugby league, but Mike Dimitro did not give up, he was able to organize two exhibitions against Australia and New Zealand in California that did not turn out to be a big success. An American side also made a short tour of France in early 1954, including a match against the France national team in Paris. France beat US 31–0.

Mike Dimitro was still optimistic of developing the game in the United States but his bid to host a Rugby League World Cup in the 1960s failed.

Rugby League through the 1970s and 1980s
In the 1970s former American football player Mike Mayer founded the United States Rugby League with the intention of forming the country's first professional rugby league competition. Between 1976 and 1978, Mayer secured franchising rights from the British Rugby Football League and attempted to attract funding from British and Australian promoters to help establish a twelve-team professional competition. The proposed league would have chiefly relied on attracting American football players who could not make it in the National Football League. However, Mayer was unable to find sufficient financial backing, and the league never got off the ground.

In the 1980s interest in amateur rugby league began to grow. In 1986 a new competition, the Tri-Counties Rugby League, was established with three teams in Canada and one from the United States, the New York state-based Adirondacks club. In 1987 the Australian state teams of Queensland and New South Wales played a fourth exhibition match following the three 1987 State of Origin series matches in Long Beach, California. The result of this match was not to be included in official statistics, but in recent years the New South Wales Rugby League and media organizations based in that state have added the win to their tally. Promoters claimed the match drew 10,000 spectators, but detractors said it drew only about 7,000 and was not a financial success.

Meanwhile, Mayer had continued to promote rugby league. His efforts resulted in establishing a national team to play a match against Canada in 1987; this would be the US' first international match since the 1950s. The following year he was involved in promoting an exhibition game between the English teams the Wigan Warriors and the Warrington Wolves at County Stadium in Milwaukee, Wisconsin. Wigan defeated Warrington 12–5, in front of a crowd of 17,773.

1990s: National team and the AMNRL

In 1991 Rugby World TV promoter John F. Morgan of Lake Placid, NY was petitioned by Rugby League Australia to bring a U.S. team to the Sydney 7s and in 1993 Morgan created the American Patriots who became a novel hit at the event. Morgan also acquired the TV rights to ARL competitions and aired them on his Rugby World TV program from 1991 to 1995. He also attempted to launch League in the US and convinced the RFL to send an Ireland Team to the US for St. Patrick's Day matches in 1995 and 1996. The games were staged at RFK Stadium and televised live by ESPN2 in 1995 and delayed in 1996. In 1992 former St George Dragons player David Niu moved to Philadelphia and began to introduce rugby league to the Glen Mills Schools, where he was employed as a teacher. Soon after, he was contacted by Morgan and they set about building a U.S. national team with Niu as player coach to compete in international tournaments for the first time. Morgan also hosted a few USA/Canada matches and a USA/Russia match at Kezar Stadium in San Francisco in 1996. Niu took over for Morgan after the 96 season. Under Niu's leadership the United States competed in the Super League World Nines (1996, 1997), Rugby League Emerging Nations Tournament (2000 and Victory Cup (2003, 2004) competitions.

In the mid-1990s, rugby league promoters including Australian-American Niu worked to promote the game domestically, and in 1997 the first rugby league organizing body, Super League America, was formed, with Niu as its head. Super League America was recognized as the official governing body for the sport by the Rugby League International Federation, and was in charge of organizing the national team and establishing a domestic competition. The domestic competition kicked off in 1998 and was contested by six team; the Glen Mills Bulls (later the Aston Bulls), the New Jersey Sharks (later the Bucks County Sharks), the New York Broncos (later the New York Knights), the Philadelphia Bulldogs (now the Philadelphia Fight), the Boston Storm, and the Pennsylvania Raiders, with Glen Mills winning the inaugural championship. Boston and Pennsylvania later dropped out of the league, while the remaining four teams continued to play under the guidance of Super League America. In 2000, Super League America announced a reorganization; the league headquarters were moved to Jacksonville, Florida, with Jacksonville-based marketing executive Steve Gormley serving as the organization's new president. Niu would serve as CEO and maintain the northeastern branch in Philadelphia. The organization was renamed the United States Rugby League, and set its sights on expanding into the Southeastern United States and attracting British rugby league teams to Florida for training camps and international competitions. The USRL was successful in entering the US national team into the Rugby League World Cup qualification process for the first time, as they participated unsuccessfully in the 2000 Rugby League World Cup qualifying tournament. However, a dispute involving the British Rugby Football League led to financial difficulties and internal strife within the USRL.

2000s: Domestic and international growth 
In May 2001, the five domestic teams announced the formation of the American National Rugby League, which became the de facto governing body for the sport in the US after Gormley sold the remaining USRL assets to the Rugby football League. The league then set about expanding over the next few years, with Wilmington Vikings, later the New York Raiders, joining the competition in 2002, bringing the number of teams back up to six. The following year the saw the addition of the Connecticut Wildcats and the DC Slayers.

2006 saw further expansion as the league added a first Southern club in Jacksonville Axemen, while further Northeastern clubs were added in New Haven Warriors, and the Boston Braves. The Fairfax Eagles joined the competition in 2007, and the Boston Thirteens joined in 2009. Another founder member, the Bucks County Sharks, suspended operations in 2010, while the Pittsburgh Vipers were added.

In 2009, a new professional rugby league competition, the National Rugby League USA (NRLUS), was announced. The new league was to include administrators and talent from the AMNRL, and was intended to begin play in 2010. However,  the league had not gotten off the ground, and officials announced their hopes that play would begin in 2011, citing the late 2000s recession as a factor in the league's lack of progress.

2010s: split competition
The start of 2011 saw a schism in American rugby league, with seven sides leaving the AMNRL to form a new competition, the USA Rugby League. The departing clubs cited a lack of club input and stability in the administration of the AMNRL as the main reason for forming the new competition. The departing clubs were New Haven Warriors, Jacksonville Axemen, Philadelphia Fight, Boston Thirteens, Pittsburgh Sledgehammers, Washington DC Slayers and Fairfax Eagles. The New Jersey Turnpike Titans and Rhode Island Rebellion were new teams that came into being as a result of the USA Rugby League's formation and served as founding clubs to the new competition.

In retribution, the AMNRL used its position as the RLIF sanctioned US body to overlook any USARL affiliated players from selection for USA national representative football. This enticed several players to abandon their local USARL club in the hope of representing the national team, such as Apple Pope.

2011 saw the creation of the American Youth Rugby League Association. The sole concern of AYRLA is introducing the sport to American youth. Since 2011, the American Youth Rugby League Association has created and administered summer camps and clinics in addition to a Middle School Flag Competition, A U23 Tackle Competition, A Training School Program (youth prison), a U23 Representative Side dubbed the 'AYRLA Americans', and  a High School Competition. Also AYRLA has created coaching courses that are geared for Americans and American youth. The American Youth Rugby League Association is responsible for the first American in history to be brought through a rugby league youth development program to play for a first grade side.

In 2012, the AMNRL reached a partnership agreement with Grand Prix Rugby to broadcast and finance the sport within the US, in the lead up to the 2013 Rugby League World Cup.

During this period, the USARL looked to consolidate its domestic competition while the AMNRL struggled domestically, with only New York Knights and Connecticut Wildcats maintaining regular competition under the AMNRL banner. In 2014, the USARL announced the formation of a Southern conference, with the Atlanta Rhinos and Central Florida Warriors among participating teams, while the Brooklyn Kings joined the Northeastern conference. Meanwhile, the AMNRL competition failed to materialize in 2014 and, following the end of David Niu's long association with the sport, the AMNRL ceded their RLIF membership and folded as an organization, with the USARL being accepted as the sole governing body for the sport in November 2014 and the few remaining AMNRL teams being accepted into the USARL competition.

In 2016, the USA was awarded the 2025 Rugby League World Cup along with co-host, neighbors Canada. However, plans for the World Cup to be held in the US and Canada were scrapped on December 4, 2018, due to financial concerns and that the location of the 2025 Rugby League World Cup would be determined by a new bidding process in 2019.

National competitions
In 2022, The Commission for Rugby League in the United States (USARLC) was established and claimed that it had the agreement of the International Rugby League (IRL) to become the governing body for rugby league in the United States.  The IRL issued a statement refuting the claim made bu USARLC stating that they (IRL) had had no contact with USARLC and that USARL remains the sole IRL member in the USA.

AMNRL

Tracing its origins to 1997, the American National Rugby League (AMNRL) was the United States' oldest rugby league competition. Eleven teams competed in the 2010 AMNRL season, with seven departing after the season to form the USA Rugby League, currently the only domestic rugby league competition in the US.

Before the split and decline of the AMNRL, it had announced various plans for expansion. The Chicago Stockyarders team had announced it would be embarking on a full exhibition schedule for 2011, and had future plans to join the AMNRL.  The AMNRL had also planned a four- to six-team competition for Hawaii in partnership with the Hawaii Rugby League; teams in the development were Kona, Maui, Harlequins, Spears, Islanders, and University of Hawaii. On June 10, 2011, the Utah Avalanche of Salt Lake City, Utah, announced they were joining the AMNRL as a developing team. To date, they have not yet aligned with the new USA Rugby League Other plans for a Western American National Rugby League and development in other areas had been announced at various times.

The AMNRL will return in 2022 following the governance reforms which saw the establishment of the Commission for Rugby League in the United States (USARLC).

Teams 

  Boston Thirteens
  Brooklyn Kings
  Delaware Black Foxes 
  New York Freedom (independent club, expected to join)

USARL

The USA Rugby League was announced on January 12, 2011. It was formed by seven teams formerly in the AMNRL, who are to be joined by expansion teams. It held its inaugural season during the Summer of 2011.

Teams 
Teams currently playing in the top tier of the USA Rugby League are:

  Jacksonville Axemen
  South Florida Speed
  Southwest Florida Copperheads
  Tampa Mayhem

Championship Rugby League 
The California Rugby League (CRL) was introduced in 2019 with a goal to further expand rugby league in America. It was renamed the Championship Rugby League in 2022 to reflect its expansion beyond the state of California.

Teams 

   East Palo Alto Razorbacks
   Laie Rhinos
   Sin City Islanders
   North Bay Warriors
   Provo Steelers
   Sacramento Immortals
   Salt Lake City Spartans
   San Francisco Savage
   Utah Saints Rugby

Former Teams 

Los Angeles Mongrel
San Diego Barracudas
Santa Rosa

Additionally the California Rugby League also runs a youth Rugby league setup.

Regional Competitions

Lonestar Rugby League 
The Lonestar Rugby League (LRL) is a four team rugby league competition planned in Texas.

Midwest Rugby League 

The Midwest Rugby League (MWRL) is a  rugby league football competition in the Midwest United States. In 2009 an organization named Midwest Rugby League was formed to promote rugby league in the Midwestern United States, and to operate the Stockyarders team from 2010 onwards.

Unsanctioned Competitions

North American Rugby League 

The North American Rugby League (NARL) is an unsanctioned rugby league club competition in North America. At launch, the league announced fourteen teams; twelve from United States and two from Canada.  An inaugural season was planned for 2021 but was deferred until 2022 due to increased health and safety needs regarding COVID-19 and insurance and travel costs. The league will now launch with six foundation teams, five from the United States and former professional Super League member club Toronto Wolfpack from Canada. The first season was supposed to kick off on May 21, 2022, but failed to do so. A pre-season game was played in June and an announced start for September for the competition with even more reduced sides. This also failed to start.

Expansion, popularity and development

Participation 
According to estimates in 2022, there were 700 rugby league players in the United States.

Attendance 

Although the 'heartland' of rugby league is the north east, some expansion is underway in other areas of the east coast. Efforts are being made to set up a west coast competition and midwest competition, as well as the California Rugby League.

In 2006, a new team joined the AMNRL from Boston, which played an exhibition match in 2005. Teams from New Haven (Connecticut) and Jacksonville (Florida) also joined the 2006 competition.  A Chicago team is also going through various stages of development with possible inclusion in the USARL in the future.

Florida has hosted rugby league games in the past, the state was the host to 1999 North Pacific Qualification Tournament, where the US beat both Japan and Canada to meet Lebanon for the right to play in the 2000 Rugby League World Cup. Orlando's ESPN Wide World of Sports Complex hosted the Tomahawks's test against England, for the latter's 2000 World Cup warm up game. It ended 110–0 to the away team. In 2001, Florida was also host to the Sunshine State Challenge, where the United States competed against Huddersfield, Halifax and Leeds, the miniature tournament drew a crowd of 6,700.

In 2005, an exhibition match was played in Phoenix, Arizona, to help promote rugby league outside the heartland. Plans were announced to start a west coast competition called the WAMNRL in Summer 2011.

In November 2010 the USA announced a strategic plan to grow the sport in the country with grass roots development, expansion and world cup qualification in sight.

Current expansion franchises as of the 2020s include the Chicago Stockyarders and Cleveland Rugby League. The USARL as of 2021 plans to expand in all formats of the game such as Wheelchair rugby league, Masters Rugby League and Women's rugby league.

Youth rugby league 
In 2011 The American Youth Rugby League Association was formed as a 501(c)(3) tax exempt organization. The goals of the American Youth Rugby League Association otherwise known as AYRLA are dedicated to introducing the sport to youth throughout the United States. AYRLA has formed a partnership with Rugby League Clubs in the USA most Notably the Rhode Island Rebellion and the Philadelphia Fight, in efforts to launch youth competitions and clinics in schools and towns, utilizing players coaches and administrators of local club's to run the day to day programs.

The American Youth Rugby League Association have created Middle School, U23 and  High School Competitions. Additionally AYRLA has created and assist run summer camps and clinics. For a history look here

National team

The USA national rugby league team competed in the 2013 Rugby League World Cup, the nation's first appearance at the tournament, and exceeded expectations by topping their group and reaching the quarter-finals before losing to Australia.

See also

 North American Rugby League
 Comparison of American football and rugby league
 List of American rugby league champions

References

External links 
AMNRL
USA Rugby League